Eugeniusz Baziak (8 March 1890 in Tarnopol – 15 June 1962 in Warsaw, Poland) was Archbishop of Lviv and apostolic administrator of Kraków. Baziak was rector of the Clerical Seminarium in Lviv. Since 1933 he was an auxiliary bishop and, since 1944, Archbishop of Lviv. In 1951, after the death of Cardinal Adam Stefan Sapieha, he became the apostolic administrator of the archdiocese in Kraków.

In his capacity as apostolic administrator of Kraków, he recommended to Pope Pius XII the promotion of Karol Wojtyła (the future Pope John Paul II), who was then a priest in the Archdiocese of Kraków, to the office of auxiliary bishop of that archdiocese. It is said that this recommendation was made in so strong terms that the Holy See made the appointment without even consulting with the Primate of Poland, Stefan Wyszyński, as was usual. Instead, Wyszyński received notice from the Vatican that he was simply to inform Wojtyła of the appointment, and ask him for his acceptance.

After Wojtyła accepted and the appointment was formalized by the Pope, it fell to Baziak to be the principal consecrator, Bishops Kominek and Jop being co-consecrators, of Wojtyła as a bishop, the episcopal consecration occurring in September 1958. Wojtyła would eventually succeed Baziak at Kraków after Baziak's death.

Notes

External links 
 

1890 births
1962 deaths
People from Ternopil
People from the Kingdom of Galicia and Lodomeria
Archbishops of Lviv
Clergy from Lviv